The Basel Institute for Immunology (BII) was founded in 1969 as a basic research institute in immunology located at 487 Grenzacherstrasse, Basel, Switzerland on the Rhine River down the street from the main Hoffmann-La Roche campus near the Swiss-German border.  The institute opened its doors in 1971.

Description

It was a unique concept in the history of mechanisms for funding basic science and the relationship between basic science and industry.  Through the influence of Paul Sacher, Swiss conductor and patron of the arts and sciences, drug company Hoffmann-LaRoche committed unrestricted support of $24 million per year and freedom of design of the institute to its founding director Niels K. Jerne. Jerne retired in 1980 and was succeeded by Fritz Melchers, who generally maintained Jerne's themes and vision.

Research groups

The institute was constructed to consist of about 50 scientists in interactive research groups of 3 to 5 researchers supported by technical staff with no titles other than “member” with renewable contracts of 2 to 5 years.    Interaction was facilitated by laboratories split into two floors per lab connected by a spiral staircase surrounding a central gathering room. Famously, Charley Steinberg mostly presided over casual meetings in the cafeteria.  Scientists from beginning postdoctoral to senior professor were provided complete freedom of research design without the pressures of individual fund raising, proposal writing, politicking and pressure to fit research to popular demands and funding source.  The institute's administrative structure was minimal.  Continuous visits by distinguished visiting scientists from around the world for periods of a day to months enriched the environment.

Culture and Achievements 

Establishment of the BII coincided with a convergence of a critical mass of young and energetic scientists from around the world in Basel to staff three startup research ventures to exploit the newly breaking technologies related to molecular biology, gene cloning and development of mouse models.  In addition to BII, these were the Friedrich Miescher Institute (FMI) sponsored by Ciba-Geigy (now Novartis) and the Biozentrum  sponsored by the University of Basel.  In the 1970s it was estimated that 17 different languages were spoken at the institute united by English, the common language of science.  Social gatherings between the international staff of the three institutes and heated discussions concerning lifestyles, the arts and in particular science in the pubs of Basel were common in the period.

The BII was known as a training ground for independent thinking and career development rather than a place to be for an entire career.  While maintaining a relatively constant core of 50 scientists over its 30-year history, the average age of which was at any one time 35 years, the BII gave rise to over 500 scientists who worked and trained there who with their scientific progeny represent the core of the field of immunology worldwide.   Institute scientists were awarded 27 prestigious international awards in immunology that include three Nobel Prizes, Georges J.F. Köhler, Niels K. Jerne, and Susumu Tonegawa.

Dissolution

In 2000, the BII was dissolved by Hoffmann-La Roche to be succeeded at the Hoffmann-LaRoche campus by a more traditional mission- and profit-oriented research and development (R&D) division of the company, the Roche Center for Medical Genomics.  In 2010, the original site of the Basel Institute for Immunology, Grenzacherstrasse 487 in Basel was listed as the home of Basilea Pharmaceutica Ltd.

References

External links
 Book Review: The History of the Basel Institute for Immunology, Frontiers in Immunology A review of a new book on the founding, history, and culture of the Institute.
 Festschrift in honor of Ivan Lefkovits.  Scandinavian Journal of Immunology 62 (Suppl. 1), 1-22, 2005---contains some experiences of former BII members, photos]

Organisations based in Basel
Immunology organizations
Medical research institutes in Switzerland
Organizations established in 1969
1969 establishments in Switzerland